S. Murugesan is an Indian politician and former Member of Parliament elected from Tamil Nadu. He was elected to the Lok Sabha from Tenkasi constituency as an Anna Dravida Munnetra Kazhagam candidate in 1998, and 1999 elections.

References 

All India Anna Dravida Munnetra Kazhagam politicians
Living people
India MPs 1998–1999
India MPs 1999–2004
Lok Sabha members from Tamil Nadu
People from Tirunelveli district
Year of birth missing (living people)